John Peter Bell is a former Canadian diplomat. He was concurrently appointed as Ambassador Extraordinary and Plenipotentiary to Mali and Niger then to Upper Volta and to the Ivory Coast. He later became Ambassador Extraordinary and Plenipotentiary to Brazil then  the High Commissioner to Malaysia.

External links 
 Foreign Affairs and International Trade Canada Complete List of Posts
B.C. court throws curveball on spousal support

Notes 

Year of birth missing (living people)
Living people
Ambassadors of Canada to Mali
Ambassadors of Canada to Niger
Ambassadors of Canada to Burkina Faso
Ambassadors of Canada to Ivory Coast
Ambassadors of Canada to Brazil
High Commissioners of Canada to Malaysia